Icons: The Greatest Person of the 20th Century (also referred to as simply Icons) is a 2019 BBC television series, aired on BBC Two, which pits the greatest people of the 20th century against each other in a competition.

Premise 
Each episode contains four 'icons' in a particular field, with a presenter or "advocate" leading the audience through each of the four choices. The audience then has one vote in which they can choose their favourite icon, who would go through to the final, or in the case of the final, be their winner.

Results

Heat One – Leaders 
Broadcast – 8 January 2019 
Advocate – Sir Trevor McDonald

Heat Two – Explorers 
Broadcast – 9 January 2019 
Advocate – Dermot O'Leary

Heat Three – Scientists 
Broadcast – 14 January 2019 
Advocate – Chris Packham

Heat Four – Entertainers 
Broadcast – 15 January 2019 
Advocate – Kathleen Turner

Michael Jackson

Heat Five – Activists 
Broadcast – 21 January 2019 
Advocate – Sanjeev Bhaskar

Heat Six – Sports Stars 
Broadcast – 22 January 2019 
Advocate – Clare Balding

Heat Seven – Artists and Writers 
Broadcast – 29 January 2019 
Advocate – Lily Cole

Episode Eight – The Final 
This episode was broadcast live from Indigo at The O2, hosted by Nick Robinson and Claudia Winkleman on 5 February 2019.

Controversy 
The Icons series attracted controversy after some people were left unhappy with those selected to represent each category. The Entertainers category sparked particular debate through the omission of Elvis Presley, The Beatles, and Madonna, while Diana, Princess of Wales, and John F. Kennedy also received support.

References

External links 

2019 British television series debuts
2019 British television series endings
2010s British documentary television series
BBC television documentaries
Top people lists
20th century-related lists